De Abasin Sape or the Abasin Waves is a professional football club from Afghanistan. They play in the Afghanistan Champions League. Based in the city of Khost, club represents provinces of Khost, Paktia, Paktika and Logar in the southeastern region of Afghanistan.

Etymology
De Abasin Sape is named after Abāsīn, the Pashto name of the Indus River, a major river in eastern Khyber Pakhtunkhwa and Pakistan. The Kabul River (flowing through Kabul, Nangarhar, and Khyber Pakhtunkhwa provinces) and the Kurram River (which flows through Paktia, Khost, Kurram, and Khyber Pakhtunkhwa) are two major western tributaries flowing from Afghanistan into the Indus river.

Club history
The club was founded in August 2012 by the creation of Afghan Premier League, and played in one of the inaugural games. Club players were chosen through a casting-show called Maidon-E-Sabz ("Green Field").

The club represents South-Eastern region of Afghanistan around Khost.

It is named after a Pashto language name for the Indus River – Abasin ("Father of Rivers").

Players

Last registered squad

References

External links
Afghan Premier League: De Abasin Sape

Football clubs in Afghanistan
Khost
Association football clubs established in 2012
2012 establishments in Afghanistan